Dolores Costello (September 17, 1903 – March 1, 1979) was an American film actress who achieved her greatest success during the era of silent movies. She was nicknamed "The Goddess of the Silent Screen" by her first husband, the actor John Barrymore. She was the mother of John Drew Barrymore.

Early years
Dolores Costello was born in Pittsburgh, Pennsylvania; the daughter of actors Maurice Costello and Mae Costello (née Altschuk). She was of Irish and German descent. She had a younger sister, Helene, and the two made their first film appearances in the years 1909–1915 as child actresses for the Vitagraph Film Company. They played supporting roles in several films starring their father, who was a popular matinee idol at the time. Dolores Costello's earliest listed credit on the IMDb is in the role of a fairy in a 1909 adaptation of Shakespeare's A Midsummer Night's Dream.

Film career

The two sisters appeared on Broadway together as chorines and their success resulted in contracts with Warner Bros. Pictures. In 1926, following small parts in feature films, Dolores Costello was selected by John Barrymore to star opposite him in The Sea Beast, a loose adaptation of Herman Melville's Moby-Dick, after which Warner soon began starring her in her own vehicles. Meanwhile, she and Barrymore became romantically involved and married in 1928.

Within a few years of achieving stardom, Costello had become a film personality in her own right. As a young adult her career developed to the degree that in 1926, she was named a WAMPAS Baby Star, and had acquired the nickname "The Goddess of the Silver Screen".
Warners alternated Costello between films with contemporary settings and elaborate costume dramas. In 1927, she was re-teamed with John Barrymore in When a Man Loves, an adaptation of Manon Lescaut.  In 1928, she co-starred with George O'Brien in Noah's Ark, a part-talkie epic directed by Michael Curtiz.

Costello spoke with a lisp and found it difficult to make the transition to talking pictures, but after two years of voice coaching she was comfortable speaking before a microphone. One of her early sound film appearances was with her sister Helene in Warner Bros.'s all-star extravaganza, The Show of Shows (1929).

Her acting career became less a priority for her following the birth of her first child, Dolores Ethel Mae "DeeDee" Barrymore, on April 8, 1930, and she retired from the screen in 1931 to devote time to her family. Her second child, John Drew Barrymore, was born on June 4, 1932, but the marriage proved difficult due to her husband's increasing alcoholism, and they divorced in 1935.

She resumed her career a year later and achieved some successes, most notably in Little Lord Fauntleroy (1936), and The Magnificent Ambersons (1942).  She retired permanently from acting following her appearance in This is the Army (1943), again under the direction of Michael Curtiz.

Making a rare radio appearance, Costello appeared as the Danish Countess Elsa on the radio program Suspense with an air date of August 28, 1943. The title of the episode is The King's Birthday written by Corporal Leonard Pellitier,  U.S. Army.

Later years
In 1939, she married Dr. John Vruwink, an obstetrician who was her physician during her pregnancies, but they divorced in 1950. Costello spent the remaining years of her life in semi-seclusion, managing an avocado farm. Her film career was largely ruined by the destructive effects of early film makeup, which ravaged her complexion too severely to camouflage.  Her final film was This Is the Army (1943). In the 1970s her house was inundated in a flash flood which caused a good deal of damage to her property and memorabilia from her movie career and life with John Barrymore.

Shortly before her death, she was interviewed for the documentary series Hollywood (1980) discussing her film career. She died from emphysema in Fallbrook, California, in 1979, and is interred in Calvary Cemetery, East Los Angeles.

Dolores Costello has a star on the Hollywood Walk of Fame for her contributions to Motion Pictures, at 1645 Vine Street.

Filmography

Child roles
Dolores Costello appeared as a child actress in many films made between 1909  and 1915 . Among them are:

Adult roles

She restarted her motion picture career in 1923 after spending several years modeling in New York.

Notes

References

External links

 Dolores Costello photo gallery
 
 
 
 Photographs of Dolores Costello
 Dolores and Anita Louise with the legendary Daniel Frohman in 1936 at Actors Fund Benefit (Corbis Images)

1903 births
1979 deaths
Actresses from Pittsburgh
American child actresses
American stage actresses
American silent film actresses
American film actresses
American people of German descent
American people of Irish descent
Barrymore family
Deaths from emphysema
Warner Bros. contract players
20th-century American actresses
Burials at Calvary Cemetery (Los Angeles)
WAMPAS Baby Stars